Ma Ma is a 2015 Spanish drama film directed by Julio Medem. It was screened in the Special Presentations section of the 2015 Toronto International Film Festival.

Plot 
Magda (Penélope Cruz) is an unemployed teacher. She is diagnosed with breast cancer and battles the disease. This creates unexpected bonds with people close to her.

Cast
 Penélope Cruz as Magda
 Luis Tosar as Arturo
 Asier Etxeandia as Julián
 Àlex Brendemühl as Raúl
 Silvia Abascal as Nurse
 Teo Planell
 Samuel Viyuela
 Virginia Ávila as ICU Nurse
 Anna Jiménez as Natasha
 Elena Carranza as TV reporter

Reception
Screen Daily lauded the strong cast but the "schmaltzy script and uneven tone of the film conspire to upstage [Cruz´] performance".

Awards and nominations

See also
 List of Spanish films of 2015

References

External links
 
 

2015 films
2015 drama films
Spanish drama films
2010s Spanish-language films
Films about cancer
Films directed by Julio Medem
Films scored by Alberto Iglesias
Morena Films films
2010s Spanish films